A tooth (plural teeth) is a small, calcified, whitish structure found in the jaws (or mouths) of many vertebrates.

Tooth or Teeth may also refer to:

Music
Teeth (Filipino band), a Filipino rock band
Teeth (electronic band), UK electronic pop punk band
"Teeth" (5 Seconds of Summer song), 2019
"Teeth" (Lady Gaga song), 2009
 "Teeth", a song by Brockhampton from Saturation II
 "Teeth", a song by Cage the Elephant from Melophobia
 "Teeth", a song by Die Monster Die from Withdrawal Method
 "Teeth", a song by Fireworks from their 2011 album Gospel

Other media
Teeth (1924 film)
Teeth (2007 film), a comedy horror film
Tooth, a 2004 fantasy film starring Tim Dutton
Teeth, a 1998 novel by Hugh Gallagher
Teeth, an episode of the Sesame Street spin-off show Elmo's World

Other uses
Egg tooth, used by hatchlings to break through an eggshell
Human tooth for teeth in humans
 Teeth, the tines in a comb, as in narrow-toothed or wide-toothed comb

See also 

Dental anatomy, field of anatomy involving the study of human tooth structures
Teething, the process by which an infant's teeth sequentially appear by breaking through the gums
The Tooth (disambiguation), rock formations